Restoration Ruin is an album by Keith Jarrett on which he performs multiple instruments (including piano, organ, guitar, soprano saxophone, harmonica, recorder, bass guitar, drums, tambourine and sistrum), and sings his own lyrics. Recorded and released on the Atlantic Records subsidiary Vortex in 1968, the album remains unique in Jarrett’s catalogue, displaying a sound largely influenced by folk and progressive rock. It can be seen as the first part of an experimental period which explored neither traditional jazz nor classical music. Here Jarrett overdubs himself on various instruments, similar to the tribal Spirits (1985) or especially the free funk No End (2013, recorded in 1986). "Sioux City Sue New" was released as a 45 rpm single, backed with "You're Fortunate." In 1999, Collectables Records reissued the album paired with the Art Ensemble of Chicago's Bap-Tizum.

Reception 

In his quite enthusiastic Jarrett's biography Ian Carr states that:

 
The AllMusic review by Richie Unterberger awarded the album 2½ stars, and states, "Restoration Ruin is a real oddity in the Jarrett catalog: a vocal album on which he plays all the instruments. And not a jazz vocal album, either, but a folk-rock one in which he alternates – quite literally, track to track – between sub-Dylan outings and more folk-Baroque ones that echo the late-'60s work of artists like Love and Tim Buckley". The authors of the Penguin Guide to Jazz Recordings commented: "The pieces are all very short, sometimes almost perfunctory, but there is no mistaking Jarrett's gifts and, as an exercise in instrumental eclecticism, it is a much more appealing and convincing performance than the later Spirits."

Track listing
All compositions by Keith Jarrett
 "Restoration Ruin" - 2:20
 "All Right" - 2:47
 "For You and Me" - 2:40
 "Have a Real Time" - 2:51
 "Sioux City Sue New" - 2:50
 "You're Fortunate" - 2:21
 "Fire and Rain" - 2:50
 "Now He Knows Better" - 2:58
 "Wonders" - 4:02
 "Where Are You Going?" - 3:53

Personnel
Keith Jarrett – vocals, guitar, harmonica, soprano saxophone, recorder, piano, organ, electric bass, drums, tambourine, sistrum
Unidentified string quartet (tracks 1,3,5,8)

References 

Atlantic Records albums
Keith Jarrett albums
1968 albums
albums produced by George Avakian
Vortex Records albums